The 2006 Melbourne Storm season was the 9th in the club's history. They competed in the NRL's 2006 Telstra Premiership, winning a record 20 out of 24 regular season games to finish in first place and win the minor premiership, eight points clear of the second-placed Bulldogs. The team backed up their stellar defensive effort the previous year to concede just 404 points in 2006. The retirement of Robbie Kearns saw a rotating captaincy introduced between David Kidwell, Scott Hill, Cameron Smith, Matt Geyer and Michael Crocker. Cooper Cronk also assumed the halfback duties following the departure of Matt Orford. Storm won 13 of their last 14 games of the season to take a great run of form into the finals where they progressed to reach their first Grand Final since 1999 after wins over the Eels and Dragons. This broke a run of three straight semi-final exits for Craig Bellamy’s team.

Melbourne fell just short in the decider against Brisbane however the platform had now been built for a sustained run of success. The Storm's Queensland trio of Greg Inglis, Cameron Smith and Antonio Kaufusi were selected to make their international debuts for Australia in 2006. Post-season the Storm farewelled Nathan Friend and Jake Webster (Gold Coast Titans), David Kidwell (South Sydney) and Scott Hill (Harlequins Rugby League).

Season Summary
 Round 1 – Melbourne retain the Michael Moore Trophy win a 22-16 win over New Zealand Warriors. Greg Inglis provides the spark for the Storm with an early try.
 Round 2 – Up 22-0 soon after half time, Melbourne deny a second half comeback from Sydney Roosters to hold on to a 22-18 victory.
 Round 4 – Scott Hill and Billy Slater find themselves facing the NRL Judiciary due to separate incidents in Melbourne's 30-28 loss to Wests Tigers. Hill accepts a two-match suspension for laying a hand on referee Jason Robinson; while Slater attempts to get a downgrade on a serious kicking charge after lashing out at John Skandalis. His plea was unsuccessful and Slater was suspended for seven matches.
 Round 6 – Melbourne play their first ever game in Adelaide, South Australia as Penrith Panthers move their home game to Hindmarsh Stadium in the first rugby league game at the venue since 1998. A controversial try to Greg Inglis awarded by video referee Phil Cooley sparked a Storm surge to a 40-18 win.
 Round 7 – Following the completion of the 2006 Commonwealth Games, Melbourne play their first home game of the season at Olympic Park, celebrating their return with a thumping 52-6 win over Newcastle Knights. Inglis, filling in for the suspended Slater at fullback, scores two tries for the match with the first coming in the opening 60 seconds of the game.
 Round 9 – A dangerous tackle by Michael Crocker on Shane Rigon sees the Melbourne forward suspended for nine matches, including the 2006 State of Origin series. Melbourne are later hit with a $15,000 fine by the NRL for comments made by CEO Brian Waldron, coach Craig Bellamy and Crocker after the judiciary decision.
 Round 12 – Penrith er Frank Pritchard accuses Ian Donnelly of eye-gouging during Melbourne's golden point 17-16 victory. Pritchard failure to make an on-field complaint and a lack of video evidence sees the matter dropped, with Donnelly accepting a one-match suspension for contrary conduct charge (grapple tackle). The golden point win is Melbourne's first ever victory in extra time, coming in just the club's second game to go past 80 minutes since 2003.
 1 June – New NRL franchise Gold Coast Titans announces the signing of Melbourne er Steve Turner, sparking a tug-o-war between the clubs who both claim Turner will be playing for them in 2007.
 Round 13 – A sickening spear tackle by Lopini Paea on Melbourne's Ben Cross is the lowlight in Melbourne's 20-16 win over Sydney Roosters at Olympic Park. Paea later is suspended for 10 matches by the NRL Judiciary. A double by Greg Inglis was Melbourne's highlight, however Billy Slater again found himself in trouble, this time receiving a two-match suspension for a dangerous throw.
 Round 14 – Melbourne claimed the outright competition lead for the first time since 1998, defeating Parramatta Eels 34-22. An accusation that Fuifui Moimoi had bitten Brett White was dismissed by the NRL Judiciary due to lack of video evidence, while no Melbourne players were cited for dangerous tackles despite the protests from Parramatta players.
 Round 15 – A 22-2 first half blitz saw Melbourne cruise home to a 22-12 victory over Canberra Raiders, but the scoreless second half concerned coach Craig Bellamy.
 Round 16 – Trailing 12-10 with seconds remaining, Melbourne came from the clouds to defeat bogey team Canterbury-Bankstown Bulldogs 16-12 to maintain their unbeaten run at Olympic Park. A speculative kick from Cooper Cronk bounced perfectly for Ryan Hoffman who passed inside for Jake Webster to score the try as time expired.
 1 July – Young er Jake Webster is announced as a new signing by Gold Coast Titans.
 Round 18 – In front of the biggest Olympic Park crowd in six years (15,479), Melbourne defeat Brisbane Broncos 10-4, with Billy Slater returning to the line-up following his suspensions and stints with feeder clubs Norths Devils and North Sydney Bears.
 Round 20 – Club stalwart Matt Geyer celebrates his 200th game for the club in style, converting the last try in a 28-12 win over Cronulla-Sutherland Sharks. Geyer is chaired from the ground by Cameron Smith and Antonio Kaufusi.
 23 July – The Sunday Telegraph reports that Melbourne has signed retired former captain Robbie Kearns to a $2 playing contract in case of injuries.
 1 August – Chris Walker is released by Melbourne for "personal reasons". Walker had played seven games for the club after crossing from Sydney Roosters.
 Round 22 – Jake Webster equals the individual club record for tries in a game, scoring four tries in Melbourne's 46-4 thumping of Wests Tigers.
 Round 23 – A crowd of over 40,000 (the biggest attendance at a Melbourne fixture since the 1999 NRL Grand Final) witness a high-quality contest between the Storm and Broncos, with Melbourne fighting back from a 10-0 halftime deficit to win 18-12 at Suncorp Stadium. The victory is Melbourne's 11th in-a-row, a new club record. Michael Crocker is again sent to the NRL Judiciary for a dangerous tackle, and is suspended for two matches.
 15 August – Despite agreeing to a three-year contract for an impending move to the Gold Coast, Steve Turner claims he had changed his mind and re-signs with Melbourne on a similar deal. Gold Coast management threaten to enforce the contract with Turner and force him to sit out of the game if he does not comply with his original deal.
 Round 24 – Melbourne's winning streak is ended at 11 by the New Zealand Warriors in a shock 24-20 defeat at Olympic Park. Two tries to Brent Webb, including a controversial late try, was the difference as the Warriors took home the Michael Moore Trophy, their first win at Olympic Park since 2002.
 20 August – Foundation Storm player Scott Hill announces he will be leaving the club at the end of the 2006 season, taking up an offer to play in the Super League with Harlequins.
 5 September – Cameron Smith is awarded the Dally M Medal, winning the medal by four points. Smith is the first Melbourne player to win the game's official best and fairest award. Craig Bellamy is named coach of the year.
 14 September – The Australian reports that the Australian Rugby Union have targeted Greg Inglis as their next high-profile rugby league recruit.
 17 September – Steve Turner reveals he is prepared to take legal action against Gold Coast Titans in order to remain with Melbourne Storm in 2007.
 Round 26 – Melbourne is presented with the J. J. Giltinan Shield as NRL minor premiers for the first time. Melbourne's 20 wins see them eight points clear on top of the NRL ladder.
 Qualifying Final – Melbourne ride their luck in the second half of their qualifying final against Parramatta Eels, taking a tight 12-6 victory. After leading 12-0 at half time, a 'no try' ruling against Glenn Morrison 11 minutes into the second half sparked a Parramatta comeback, with Melbourne having to hold off the eighth-placed Eels in a tense finish.
 Preliminary Final – Melbourne advance to the 2006 NRL Grand Final with a 24-10 win over St George Illawarra Dragons at Telstra Stadium. The win comes at a cost with Michael Crocker sustaining a serious knee injury.
 Grand Final – In the first Grand Final to feature two teams from outside New South Wales, Brisbane thwart Melbourne's bid for a second NRL premiership in a grinding 15-8 win, featuring a number of controversial calls by referee Paul Simpkins and video referee Bill Harrigan. A brilliant run and pass from Scott Hill set up Steve Turner for the first try of the game, with Hill also providing the last pass for Melbourne's second try through Matt King to level the scores at 8-8.
 2 October – Television ratings figures for the Grand Final indicate that more people watched the game in Melbourne than they did in Sydney. Official figures indicate that the average audience in Melbourne was 903,000.
 4 October – Matt King is slapped with a $5,000 fine by the NRL for calling Paul Simpkins a "dickhead" at a club fan day after the Grand Final.
 20 November – The contractual saga involving Steve Turner reaches a climax as Gold Coast Titans CEO Michael Searle saying that they are willing to offer Turner a release after one season if he is unhappy with the new club.

Milestone games

Jerseys
Continuing with apparel manufacturer Reebok, the designs of Melbourne's home and clash jerseys were unchanged from 2005. Corporate partner Medibank Private upgraded their sponsorship to be the chest advertiser, while Mortgage House replaced them as jersey sleeve advertiser. Hostplus was a new advertiser on the rear of the jerseys, with their logo appearing above and below the player's numbers for the first time.

Fixtures

Pre Season

Regular season

Source:
(GP) - Golden Point extra time
(pen) - Penalty try

Finals

Ladder

2006 Coaching Staff
 Head Coach: Craig Bellamy
 Assistant Coaches: Michael Maguire & Stephen Kearney
 Development Coach: Marc Brentnall
 Strength and Conditioning Coach: Alex Corvo
 Football Manager: Dean Lance

2006 Squad
List current as of 28 September 2021

Player movements

Losses
 Steven Bell to Manly Warringah Sea Eagles
 Alex Chan to Catalans Dragons
 Josh Graham to Western Force (rugby)
 Robbie Kearns to Retirement
 Jamie McDonald to Toulouse Olympique
 Tevita Metuisela to Wests Tigers
 Matt Orford to Manly Warringah Sea Eagles
 Peter Robinson to Retirement
 Dennis Scott to Retirement

Gains
 Russell Aitken from North Queensland Cowboys (midseason)
 Michael Crocker from Sydney Roosters
 Ben Cross from Canberra Raiders
 Garret Crossman from Penrith Panthers
 Jeff Lima from Wests Tigers
 Chris Walker from Sydney Roosters

Representative honours
This table lists all players who have played a representative match in 2006.

Statistics
This table contains playing statistics for all Melbourne Storm players to have played in the 2006 NRL season. 

Statistics sources:

Scorers

Most points in a game: 18 points
 Round 9 – Cameron Smith (1 try, 7 goals) vs South Sydney

Most tries in a game: 4 
 Round 22 – Jake Webster vs Wests Tigers

Winning games

Highest score in a winning game: 52 points 
 Round 7 vs Newcastle Knights

Lowest score in a winning game: 10 points
 Round 18 vs Brisbane Broncos

Greatest winning margin: 46 points 
 Round 7 vs Newcastle Knights

Greatest number of games won consecutively: 11
 Round 12 – Round 23

Losing games

Highest score in a losing game: 28 points
 Round 4 vs Wests Tigers

Lowest score in a losing game: 8 points 
 Round 3 vs North Queensland Cowboys
 Grand Final vs Brisbane Broncos

Greatest losing margin: 32 points
 Round 3 vs North Queensland Cowboys

Greatest number of games lost consecutively: 2 
 Round 3 – Round 4

Feeder Teams
For a second season, Melbourne split their reserve players between two feeder clubs. The agreement with Norths Devils continued for a ninth season, with players who were dual-registered in Queensland travelling to Brisbane each week to play with the Devils in the Queensland Cup. Some players travelled to Sydney to play with foundation New South Wales Rugby League club North Sydney Bears in the NSWRL Premier League. The 2006 season would be the final season of this arrangement, with Melbourne ending the affiliation with North Sydney after the season.

The Devils missed the Queensland Cup finals for the first time since 2003, while the Bears coached by Josh White, finished 12th and missed the finals. Both teams featured a rare appearance by Billy Slater following his return from a second suspension during the NRL season.

Awards and honours

Trophy Cabinet
2006 J. J. Giltinan Shield

Melbourne Storm Awards Night
 Melbourne Storm Player of the Year: Cameron Smith 
 Best Forward: Ryan Hoffman
 Best Back: Greg Inglis
 Most Improved: Cooper Cronk
 Rookie of the Year: Adam Blair
 Greg Brentnall Young Achievers Award: Russell Weber
 Mick Moore Club Person of the Year: Jonce Dimovski
 Best Try: Jake Webster – Round 16 vs Canterbury-Bankstown Bulldogs
 Life Member Inductees: Chris Anderson, John Ribot & Scott Hill

Dally M Awards Night
Dally M Medal: Cameron Smith
Dally M Hooker of the Year: Cameron Smith
Dally M Halfback of the Year: Cooper Cronk
Dally M Coach of the Year: Craig Bellamy

RLPA Awards Night
RLPA New Zealand Representative Player of the Year: David Kidwell
RLPA Best Back Player of the Year: Greg Inglis
NRL Academic Player of the Year: Matt Geyer
RLPA Wellbeing and Education Club of the Year

RLIF Awards
RLIF International Newcomer of the Year: Greg Inglis

Additional Awards
Rugby League World World XIII: Matt King (wing); Greg Inglis (wing); Cameron Smith (hooker)

Notes

References

Melbourne Storm seasons
Melbourne Storm season